K2-72 (also designated EPIC 206209135) is a cool red dwarf star of spectral class M2.7V located about  away from the Earth in the constellation of Aquarius. It is known to host four planets, all similar in size to Earth, with one of them residing within the habitable zone.

Nomenclature and history
K2-72 also has the 2MASS catalogue number J22182923-0936444. Its EPIC (Ecliptic Plane Input Catalog) number is 206209135.

The star's planetary companions were discovered by NASA's Kepler Mission, a mission tasked with discovering planets in transit around their stars. The transit method that Kepler uses involves detecting dips in brightness in stars. These dips in brightness can be interpreted as planets whose orbits move in front of their stars from the perspective of Earth. The name K2-72 derives directly from the fact that the star is the catalogued 72nd star discovered by the K2 mission to have confirmed planets.
 
The designation b, c, d, and e derives from the order of discovery. The designation of b is given to the first planet orbiting a given star, and e to the last. In the case of K2-72, there were four planets, so only letters b to e are used. At first the planets were all thought to be smaller than Earth. However, in 2017, new analysis by Martinez et al. and Courtney Dressing found that K2-72 was significantly larger than previous estimates, and found that the planets were all larger than Earth, although all are still expected to be rocky.

Stellar characteristics
K2-72 is a M-type star that is approximately 27% the mass of and 33% the radius of the Sun, according to the analysis done by Dressing et al. The results found by Martinez et al. suggest a larger star, with about 36% the radius and mass of the Sun. Both give a luminosity estimate between 0.013 and 0.015 solar luminosities. It has a surface temperature of between 3360 and 3370 K and its age is unknown. In comparison, the Sun is about 4.6 billion years old and has a surface temperature of 5778 K.

The star's apparent magnitude, or how bright it appears from Earth's perspective, is 15.309. Therefore, it is too dim to be seen with the naked eye and can only be observed with a telescope.

Planetary system 
The star is known to host four planets, all likely to be rocky. Only one (K2-72e) is currently known to reside inside the habitable zone, although K2-72c may straddle the inner edge.

References 

Planetary systems with four confirmed planets
Planetary transit variables
M-type main-sequence stars
J22182923-0936444
Aquarius (constellation)